Ipson is a surname. Notable people with the surname include:

Brad Ipson (born 1980), Australian cricketer
Don Ipson, American politician
Jason Todd Ipson (born 1972), American director, screenwriter, producer
Jay M. Ipson (born 1935), Litvak-American Holocaust survivor

See also
Ipsos